Friedrich Wilhelm Ernst Hardt (9 May 1876 – 3 January 1947), born Ernst Stöckhardt, was a German playwright, poet, and novelist.

Hardt was born in Graudenz, West Prussia (now Grudziądz, Poland).

He is the author of Priester des Todes (1898), Bunt ist das Leben (1902), An den Toren des Lebens (1904), and the plays Der Kampf ums Rosenrote (1903), Ninon von Lenclos (1905), Tantris der Narr (1907), Gudrun (1911), and Konig Salomo (1915).  He was director of the National Theater in Weimar (1919–24), the Schauspiel Köln in Cologne (1925), and the Westdeutscher Rundfunk (West German Broadcasting Co). (1926–1933).

He worked with Bertolt Brecht on some experimental radio broadcasts.

He was removed from his position with the Westdeutscher Rundfunk by the Nazis in 1933. A few months later he was imprisoned for a short period and then took refuge in the Sankt Anna Hospital in Cologne-Lindenthal. He was later acquitted in the "broadcast trial" and able, for a time, to resume some literary activities.

Hardt died in Ichenhausen.

References

External links
 Tristram the Jester 1907

1876 births
1947 deaths
19th-century German novelists
20th-century German novelists
German poets
People from the Province of Prussia
People from Grudziądz
German male poets
German male novelists
German male dramatists and playwrights
19th-century German dramatists and playwrights
20th-century German dramatists and playwrights
19th-century German male writers
20th-century German male writers
Westdeutscher Rundfunk people